Baat Ek Raat Ki (English: A Tale of One Night) is a 1962 Hindi film directed by Shankar Mukherjee, starring Dev Anand, Waheeda Rehman and Johnny Walker.

The film has music by Sachin Dev Burman, who gave some memorable songs in the films such as "Na Tum Hamen Jano", sung by Hemant Kumar, "Akela Hoon Main Is Duniya Mein" by Mohammed Rafi, and the hit qawwali, "Kisne Chilman Se Maara" by Manna Dey.

Plot
Neela (Waheeda Rehman) is in police custody for committing a murder. Believing that she did it, she confesses. When renowned lawyer Rajeshwar (Dev Anand) decides to represent her, he accepts her guilt, but as he goes deep into the details of her story and the circumstances, he is not sure whether or not she is guilty. What could have placed Neela at the scene of this heinous crime?

Eventually, it is revealed that Neela's employer Beni Prasad is the mastermind behind Neela's imprisonment. He is after her property and devises a plan in which Ranjan, Neela's co-actor, is to act as if he is in love with her and get her will signed. But on the night Ranjan has taken the papers to Neela and is just getting them signed, he changes his mind. He was about to surrender and tell the whole truth, when Neela held him at gunpoint — just before he could tell the name of his employer he was shot. Neela believes it's she who had killed him, whereas it was Beni Prasad, who was hiding and listening who had shot Ranjan dead.

Rajesh disguises himself and appears at the court on the final day and accuses Beni Prasad and tells the whole story. In the whole story, CID (Johnny Walker) aids him as well as Kalu, a street beggar who pretends to be blind acts as a witness. The final scene shows Rajesh driving his car and saying: "what do i get?? ...money, fame and nothing else!!" when he images Neela talking to him...answering his questions. At last, Neela appears from the back of the car and the happy couple are reunited and are said to be really in love. The movie ends with Rajesh and Neela driving the car to the song "Jo Ijaazat Ho To Ek Baat".

Cast
 Dev Anand as Rajeshwar
 Waheeda Rehman as Neela / Meena
 Johnny Walker as C.I. Dholakia "C.I.D."
 Chandrashekhar as Ranjan
 Ulhas	as Prosecuting Attorney
 Jagdish Sethi as Beni Prasad		
 Asit Sen as Ramu

Soundtrack 

The soundtrack includes the following tracks, composed by S. D. Burman with lyrics by Majrooh Sultanpuri

References

External links
 

1962 films
1960s Hindi-language films
Films scored by S. D. Burman
Indian courtroom films
Indian legal films